Goachers Brewery is an independent brewery based in Maidstone, which supplies a number of public houses across Kent.

Range
Goachers only uses malt and Kentish hops in its beers, producing a core range of ales comprising a mild, two bitter ales, a stout and a pale ale. It also produces regular seasonal ales.

 Real Mild Ale is a dark mild with an ABV of 3.4% that is hopped with Kent Fuggles
 Fine Light Ale is a pale bitter with an ABV of 3.7% hopped with WGV and East Kent Golding hops
 Best Dark Ale is a rich bitter with an ABV of 4.1% hopped with East Kent Golding hops
 Silver Star Ale is a seasonal pale ale with an ABV of 4.2% hopped with Kent Fuggles. This was first produced in 2008 to celebrate Goacher's 25th anniversary
 Crown Imperial Stout is a seasonal 4.5% ABV stout with a high level of Kent Fuggles hops
 Gold Star Ale is a pale ale with an ABV of 5.1% and hopped with East Kent aroma hops
 Old 1066 Ale is a seasonal barley wine with an ABV of 6.7% and produced in small quantities since 1983
 House Ale has an ABV of 3.8%. It was originally a blend of Fine Light and Best Dark but is now brewed as an independent ale. 

Real Mild, Fine Light Ale and Crown Imperial Stout have been CAMRA beers of the year.

History
Goachers was founded by Phil and Debbie Goacher in 1983. Originally it was situated close to Hayle Mill, later moving to larger premises on a nearby industrial estate in 1990. 

Maidstone has a long history of brewing dating back to 1650, including breweries such as Style and Winch, Fremlins Brewery, Masons and Isherwood, Foster and Stacey. The last remaining brewery in the town (Fremlins Brewery) closed in 1972. Goachers was the first new independent brewery in the town, reviving Maidstone's brewing tradition. 

Goachers has two tied houses (The Rifle Volunteers in Maidstone and The Royal Paper Mill in Tovil) and supplies numerous free houses across Kent. Goachers bought another pub - The Little Gem in Aylesford - in 2019 which needed renovation and was opened in 2021.

References

External links
 goachers.com
 RateBeer

Companies based in Kent
British companies established in 1983
Food and drink companies established in 1983
Borough of Maidstone
1983 establishments in England